10 Squadron  was a squadron of the South African Air Force. It was formed as a fighter bomber unit on 1 April 1939 and was deployed in a coastal defence role as part of Coastal Command SAAF until 1943. It was disbanded after the threat of Japanese naval actions off the South African coast had waned. It was re-activated as a fighter squadron on 25 May 1944 and deployed to the Middle East where the squadron saw service in Syria, Libya and the Aegean and was disbanded at the end of the war in Italy.

The squadron was reinstated as an unmanned aerial vehicle (UAV) squadron in January 1986 in Potchefstroom to provide artillery reconnaissance and fire control for the South African Artillery Corps. The unit was operationally deployed to Angola between 1987 and 1991 and was disbanded for the last time on 31 March 1991 when the UAV's were transferred to Kentron for operational control and deployment.

History

World War 2
10 Squadron was established on 1 April 1939 as 10 Bomber Fighter Squadron at East London. It was assigned as an Active Citizen Force squadron and was placed under command of Eastern Province Command. It was re-designated as 10 (Fighter-Bomber) Squadron (10 (F.B.) Squadron) on 1 September 1939 and renamed once again as 16 (Bomber) Squadron on 1 December 1939 under command of Witwatersrand Command while the designation of 10 (F.B.) Squadron was kept in reserve to allow for possible expansion in this type of Squadron.

The squadron role was changed back to that of a fighter squadron in February 1942 and it was designated for home defence purposes in Natal with Hawker Furies under command of Coastal Command SAAF. Fearing the possible presence of a Japanese carrier force attempting to disrupt shipping in South African waters, 6 and 10 Fighter Squadrons were re-equipped with Mohawks and later Kittyhawks and organised on a mobile basis, based at Reunion Air Field close to Durban. This structure allowed the squadron to be rapidly deployed forward to airfields along the coast to allow fighter operations in the threat area.  By July 1943 the Japanese threat had receded and the squadron was disbanded.

The squadron was re-established on 25 May 1944 and was deployed to Almaza in Syria, initially for training and later as a fighter squadron equipped with Spitfire Mk. Vs.  By the end of June 1944 the squadron was moved to Idku in the Nile Delta, where they took over convoy escort and patrol duties from 336 (Hellenic) Squadron under command of 219 Group (RAF). The squadron aircraft were upgraded to Spitfire Mk. IXs in August 1944 and was tasked with high altitude interceptions of reconnaissance and bomber aircraft. In September the squadron was moved to Luigi di Savoia, Libya for operations over Crete and the Aegean as well as anti-submarine patrols in the Eastern Mediterranean. It was disbanded on 31 October 1944 and its aircraft were transferred to 9 Squadron.

Reformation in the 1980s
The squadron was re-activated in January 1986 at AFB Potchefstroom and equipped with the Kentron Seeker UAV in the role of reconnaissance and artillery weapons delivery guidance support.  The squadron first deployed these aircraft operationally during Operation Modular in Angola in 1987.

It was finally disbanded on 31 March 1991 after the Seeker system was transferred to Kentron for operations on behalf of the SADF. The squadron flew two models: the Seeker-P model for training and the Seeker-D for operational deployment.

Aircraft operated

See also
 Denel Dynamics Seeker

Notes and references
Footnotes

Citations

External Links
 Manufacturer's official brochure (Seeker 400)

References
 

Squadrons of the South African Air Force
Disbanded military units and formations in Johannesburg
SAAF10
Military units and formations established in 1939
Military units and formations disestablished in 1991